Wuwei (r. 114–105 BCE) was a chanyu of the Xiongnu Empire. Wuwei succeeded his father Yizhixie in 114 BC and died in 105 BC. He was succeeded by his son, Er Chanyu.

Reign

Wuwei Chanyu ruled during the reign of the Han emperor Wudi (r. 141–87 BC), after Wudi broke the heqin peace and kinship treaty with the Huns. His reign was marked by relative peace, with intensive diplomatic activities.  The Huns intended to restore the heqin peace and kinship treaty with the Han empire.  In turn the Han Empire wanted to weaken, isolate, and bring the Xiongnu into submission. Neither party succeeded in their main objective, but the Chinese further undermined the Xiongnu's' situation by splitting off their Wusun branch. Wuwei was a son of Yizhixie, and came to the throne by agnatic primogeniture succession.  The Chinese annals did preserve his title before the enthronement.

Life
Wuwei Chanyu succeeded his father in 114 BC.

In the autumn of 111 BC, Gongsun He and Zhao Ponu led 25,000 cavalry against the Xiongnu, but failed to engage them.

In 110 BC Wudi assembled in Shuofang (朔方城) a 180,000-strong cavalry army, and sent Guo Ji to notify Chanyu about the mobilization. When Guo Ji arrived, the Chanyu's master of ceremony asked him about the purpose his arrival. Guo Ji, with polite evasion, said that he wished to disclose it personally to the Chanyu. Chanyu admitted him. Guo Ji told him: “If the Chanyu is in a position to mount a campaign and fight with the Chinese state, the Son of Sky himself, he is waiting for you at the border with an army; and if he is not in a position to fight, he should turn his face to the south and recognize himself a vassal of the House of Han.” Wuwei was so enraged by this ultimatum that he immediately beheaded his master of ceremony and arrested Guo Ji, sending him off to Baikal in exile. In spite of that, Chanyu was not inclined to attack the borders of China.  Instead he gave rest to the troops and horses, and went hunting.

In 110 BC, Wuwei rejected Han suggestions that he should submit to Han authority. At one point Wuwei was persuaded to pay a visit to Chang'an but cancelled the trip when news reached him that an advance Xiongnu dignitary had died on the way there. Convinced that he had been killed by the Han, Wuwei rejected all offers of peace.

In 108 BC, Zhao Ponu sallied out with 25,000 cavalry against the Xiongnu but could not find them. He then attacked Loulan Kingdom and Jushi Kingdom with only 700 cavalry, subjugating them.

Death and successor

In 105 BC, Wuwei Chanyu died on the 10th year of his reign. His son Wushilu, who was still a child, was proclaimed a chanyu according to their custom of agnatic primogeniture succession, and was named Er Chanyu. Possibly there were no elder eligible candidates.

Footnotes

References
Bichurin N.Ya., "Collection of information on peoples in Central Asia in ancient times", vol. 1, Sankt Petersburg, 1851, reprint Moscow-Leningrad, 1950 (Shiji ch. 110, Qian Han Shu ch. 94a) 

Chanyus
2nd-century BC rulers in Asia